Havasupai Elementary School (HES) is a Bureau of Indian Education (BIE)-operated K–6 school in Supai, Arizona. It serves the Havasupai Indian Reservation.

It is also known as Havasupai Indian School, and was formerly Havasupai Boarding and Day School.

It was formerly a K-8 school.

History

It had been established by 1895. At one point it was a boarding school.

In 2017 Alden Woods of the Arizona Republic wrote that it "stands out as the worst school" in the BIE. Woods cited "a rotation of principals and a regular teacher shortage", the latter which resulted in sporadic weeklong closures, or as the janitor being a substitute teacher, according to a lawsuit filed against the BIE that year. According to the lawsuit, teachers often did not finish the academic year. Woods also cited a lack of a school library, no after-school activities, and the lowest scores in mathematics and English among BIE schools despite only teaching those subjects. The school was intended to also teach the Havasupai language and the culture of the Havasupai tribe, but it did not, according to the lawsuit.

The lawsuit was filed in January 2017. Steven P. Logan, a U.S. district judge, allowed the lawsuit to proceed in March. A settlement was agreed upon in October 2020.

Student body
In 2011 it, then still a K-8, had 94 students.

 the school had 70 students, with around 35 classified as having special needs. Despite the high number of special needs students, the school offered no special needs services.

 about 20% of the students eventually get high school diplomas.

Facility
The building has one story.

In 2011, to alleviate overpopulation, the BIE arranged to have a modular classroom airlifted into sections to Havasupai Elementary, where it would be assembled.

Governance
While the Havasupai tribe maintains a board for education matters, Woods stated in 2017 that the board lacks "real influence".

Academic performance
The students were in the third percentile for mathematics and the first percentile for reading during the 2012–2013 school year.

Student discipline
In 2017 Alia Wong of The Atlantic wrote "Students are repeatedly suspended or referred to law enforcement".

Feeder patterns
As of 1988 students move on to boarding schools, with Sherman Indian High School in Riverside, California being the most common choice.

References

Further reading

External links
 
 Lawsuit - Alternate link

Public elementary schools in Arizona
Schools in Coconino County, Arizona
Public K–8 schools in Arizona
Native American schools in Arizona
Boarding schools in Arizona
Havasupai